The 1995 South Australian Soccer Federation season was the 89th season of soccer in South Australia.

1995 SASF Premier League

The 1995 South Australian Premier League season was the top level domestic association football competition in South Australia for 1995. It was contested by 8 teams in a 21 round league format, each team playing all of their opponents three times.

League table

Finals

1995 SASF State League

The 1995 South Australian State League season was the second level domestic association football competition in South Australia for 1995. It was contested by 11 teams in a 20 round league format, each team playing all of their opponents twice.

League table

Finals

References

1995 in Australian soccer
Football South Australia seasons